Shingisai Suluma (born 1971) is a Zimbabwean Christian singer, songwriter and worship leader.

Biography 
Shingisai Suluma was born to Christopher and Dorcas Chadoka in 1971. Shingisai's parents were musically-inclined; they both sang in church. She and her sister were made to sing, without a personal drive to. At about the age of seven she performed at the national conference of her church, and by the age of 17 she was the choir leader of the Braeside assembly of Zimbabwe Assemblies of God Africa. She recorded her first album in 1995 and has currently a total of 9 albums. Apart from music, Suluma is a still life and textile artist. She has spent years teaching in high schools around Harare, Zimbabwe. She is married to Pastor Stephen Suluma and they have two daughters, Tashinga and Tiara.

Education 
Shingisai went to Chembira and Kudakwashe primary schools in Glen Norah, and later to Nettleton Junior School in Braeside. She completed her O-level education at Hatfield Girls High School and proceeded to Oriel Girls School for her A-Level studies. She left Zimbabwe to study art in Wimbledon, England, before graduating with a Bachelor of Arts degree in textile and design at Surrey University. After returning to Zimbabwe she worked for years as an art teacher at Oriel Girls School, Alan Wilson Boys School, and Eaglesvale Secondary School. During the same period, she established herself as one of the most prominent gospel artists in Zimbabwe, and recorded multiple Christian albums. She studied teaching English as a second language before moving to China to teach the language. She later moved to the United States for further studies, and in 2015 she graduated with a Master of Arts in Christian Education from New Orleans Baptist Theological Seminary.

National Awards 
 National Arts Merit Awards - Outstanding Song - Nanhasi 
 Zimbabwe Music Awards (3 times) Best Female Gospel

Discography 
1995 - Zvanaka
1998 - Huyai Ishe Jesu
2000 - Mumaoko
2002 - Nokuti Wakanaka
2004 - Fara Zvakadaro
2005 - Tatenda Taona
2007 - Maitiro Enyu
2009 - Ndewake
2013 - Rwendo
2016 - Masuwo
2016 - O Holy Night-Usiku Hutsvene
2017 - Pano Patasvika

References

1971 births
21st-century Zimbabwean women singers
Living people
20th-century Zimbabwean women singers